The JGR Class 160 was a steam railway locomotive class formerly operated in Japan.

History
A total of six Class 160 locomotives were imported from the UK in 1871 and 1874. Built by Sharp, Stewart and Company, four locomotives were imported in 1871, with two more added in 1874.

Preservation
Locomotive No. 165 is preserved in operating condition at Meiji-mura in Aichi Prefecture, the oldest operating steam locomotive in Japan. While the boiler was replaced in 1985, the rest of the locomotive dates from the 1800s.

See also
 Japan Railways locomotive numbering and classification

References

2-4-0T locomotives
Steam locomotives of Japan
1067 mm gauge locomotives of Japan
Individual locomotives of Japan

Passenger locomotives